This is a list of flags used in Thailand.

National flag

Royal flags

Royal standards

Personal royal flags

Royal Thai Government flags

Naval flags

Military flags

Police flag

Religious flags

Diplomatic flags

Provincial flags

Historical flags

Naval jacks

War flags

Diplomatic flags

Prime Minister flags

Royal Thai Government flags

See also

 Royal Flags of Thailand
 Royal Standard of Thailand
 List of Military flags of Thailand
 Seals of The Provinces of Thailand

References

External links 

 

 Government
 Thai royal flags (from Thai MOD's site) 
 Thai Naval ensign and others naval flags (from Thai Naval Museum) 
 Thai naval flags 

 Private
 Siam Flag museum (White Elephant Flag)  
 Thai Flag museum (Tricolors)  
 Timeline of Thai Flag wrote by Damrong Rajanubhab
 Historical thai flag 
 Flag Law B.E. 2522 (Current Thai flag law in Thai language)

Thailand
 
Flags